In situation theory, situation semantics (pioneered  by Jon Barwise and John Perry in the early 1980s) attempts to provide a solid  theoretical foundation for reasoning about common-sense and real world situations, typically in the context of theoretical linguistics, theoretical philosophy, or applied natural language processing,

Barwise and Perry

Situations, unlike worlds, are not complete in the sense that every proposition or its negation holds in a world. According to Situations and Attitudes, meaning is a relation between a discourse  situation, a connective situation and a described situation. The original theory of Situations and Attitudes soon ran into foundational difficulties. A reformulation based on Peter Aczel's non-well-founded set theory was proposed by Barwise before this approach to the subject petered out in the early 1990s.

HPSG

Situation semantics is the first semantic theory that was used in head-driven phrase structure grammar (HPSG).

Kratzer

Barwise and Perry's system was a top-down approach which foundered on practical issues which were early identified by Angelika Kratzer and others. She subsequently developed a considerable body of theory bottom-up by addressing a variety of issues in the areas of context dependency in discourse and the syntax–semantics interface. Because of its practical nature and ongoing development this body of work "with possible situations as parts of possible worlds, now has much more influence than Barwise and Perry’s ideas".

See also

Notes

External links
 "Situations in Natural Language Semantics" – Stanford Encyclopedia of Philosophy]

Semantics